John Shurley (died October 1616), of 'The Friars', Lewes, Sussex, was an English politician.

He was born the son of Edward Shurley of Isfield, educated at Queens' College, Cambridge and studied law at Clifford's Inn where he was called to the bar by 1575.

He was an MP for Lewes 1572, 1589, 1597 and 1604; for Lostwithiel 1584.

He married twice, firstly Elizabeth, the daughter and coheiress of Richard Kyme of Lewes, with whom he had a daughter and secondly Frances, the daughter of Henry Capell of Hadham, Hertfordshire, with whom he had a son and 2 daughters.

References

16th-century births
1616 deaths
People from Lewes
Alumni of Queens' College, Cambridge
English MPs 1572–1583
English MPs 1584–1585
English MPs 1589
English MPs 1597–1598
English MPs 1604–1611
Members of the Parliament of England for Lostwithiel
English barristers